Ronald William Plumb (born July 17, 1950) is a Canadian former professional ice hockey defenceman. Ron is the brother of Robert Plumb.

Playing career
Plumb was born in Kingston, Ontario. A Peterborough Petes junior player who won the Max Kaminsky Trophy as the league's best defenceman in 1970, Plumb was drafted ninth overall by the Boston Bruins in the 1970 NHL Amateur Draft. After two seasons with their Central Hockey League farm club Oklahoma City Blazers, the Bruins protected him in the June, 1972 expansion draft. But with little chance to play with the veteran-laden NHL team, he jumped to the unproven World Hockey Association Philadelphia Blazers only weeks later. 

He remained with the Blazers as they moved to Vancouver in the following season. Plumb then played for the San Diego Mariners in 1975, the Cincinnati Stingers for the following three seasons, and the New England Whalers. He then played one season in the National Hockey League with the Hartford Whalers, remaining in the organization for two more years, but playing in the AHL with the Springfield Indians.

In the WHA, Plumb won the Dennis A. Murphy Trophy as the WHA's best defenceman in 1977, and was also selected a First or Second Team All-Star for much of the league's history. His total of 549 career games in the WHA is the second most overall, trailing only the 551 games played by André Lacroix. Lacroix was his teammate in Philadelphia, San Diego and New England.

Plumb followed his North American pro career with three seasons in Europe, 1983 with ERC Freiburg in the 2.Bundesliga, then 1984–1986 with the Fife Flyers in the British Hockey League.

Honours
Plumb was inducted into the Kingston and District Sports Hall of Fame on May 2, 2008.

In 2010, he was elected as an inaugural inductee into the World Hockey Association Hall of Fame.

Career statistics

See also
List of WHA seasons
List of AHL seasons

References

External links

1950 births
Living people
Boston Bruins draft picks
Canadian ice hockey defencemen
Cincinnati Stingers players
Fife Flyers players
EHC Freiburg players
Hartford Whalers players
Ice hockey people from Ontario
Sportspeople from Kingston, Ontario
National Hockey League first-round draft picks
New England Whalers players
Oklahoma City Blazers (1965–1977) players
Peterborough Petes (ice hockey) players
Philadelphia Blazers players
San Diego Mariners players
Springfield Indians players
Vancouver Blazers players
Canadian expatriate ice hockey players in Germany
Canadian expatriate ice hockey players in the United States
Canadian expatriate ice hockey players in Scotland
Canadian expatriate ice hockey players in Japan